Labor aristocracy or labour aristocracy (also aristocracy of labor) has at least four meanings: (1) as a term with Marxist theoretical underpinnings; (2) as a specific type of trade unionism; (3) as a shorthand description by revolutionary industrial unions (such as the Industrial Workers of the World) for the bureaucracy of craft-based business unionism; and (4) in the 19th and early 20th centuries was also a phrase used to define better-off members of the working class (as used for example by Jack London in The People of the Abyss).

Use within Marxism 

In Marxist theory, those workers (proletarians) in the developed countries who benefit from the superprofits extracted from the impoverished workers of developing countries form an "aristocracy of labor". The phrase was popularized by Karl Kautsky in 1901 and theorized by Vladimir Lenin in his treatise Imperialism, the Highest Stage of Capitalism. According to Lenin, companies in the developed world exploit workers in the developing world where wages are much lower. The increased profits enable these companies to pay higher wages to their employees "at home" (that is, in the developed world), thus creating a working class satisfied with their standard of living and not inclined to proletarian revolution. It is a form of exporting poverty, creating an "exclave" of lower social class. Lenin contended that imperialism had prevented increasing class polarization in the developed world and argued that a workers' revolution could only begin in one of the developing countries, such as Russia.

The concept of a labor aristocracy is controversial between Marxists.  While the theory is formally shared by most currents that identify positively with Lenin, including the Communist International, few organizations place the theory at the center of their work. The term is most widely used in the United States, where it was popularized in the decade prior to World War I by Eugene V. Debs's Socialist Party of America and the Industrial Workers of the World. In Britain, those who hold to this theory include the Communist Party of Great Britain (Marxist–Leninist) and the Revolutionary Communist Group. Many Trotskyists including Leon Trotsky himself and the early congresses of the Fourth International have accepted the theory of the labor aristocracy whereas others, including Ernest Mandel and Tony Cliff, considered the theory to have mistaken arguments or "Third Worldist" implications.

Albanian leader and Marxist Enver Hoxha gave the following explanation for the development of the labor aristocracy following World War II:

Criticism of business unions of workers 
The term was originally coined by Mikhail Bakunin in 1872 as a criticism of the notion that organized workers are the most radical. Bakunin wrote: "To me the flower of the proletariat is not, as it is to the Marxists, the upper layer, the aristocracy of labor, those who are the most cultured, who earn more and live more comfortably than all the other workers".

In the United States and Britain, the term "aristocracy of labor" is used as an implicit criticism of labor unions that have organized high-salary workers and have no interest in unionizing middle-income and lower-income employees—even in cases where organizing the unorganized would strengthen the unions involved. These unions, it is argued, are content to remain a "labor aristocracy".  Examples might include the unions of professional athletes, which have raised the wages of a certain class of already highly paid workers—professional athletes—but refuse to organize other workers, including other employees of the teams they work for. It commonly charged that the Air Line Pilots Association, the Screen Actors Guild and a handful of other AFL–CIO unions conform to the labor aristocracy model of trade unionism.

At the beginning of the 20th century in the United States, "most American Federation of Labor (AFL) unions did not admit unskilled mass-production workers". Selig Perlman wrote in 1923 that skilled workers organized into craft unions were more interested in trade separatism than in labor solidarity. The craft workers were capable of demanding more from their employers due to their skills and preferred to fight separately from unskilled or semiskilled workers. In Perlman's words, the trade unions declared that their purpose was "to protect the skilled trades of America from being reduced to beggary".

In 1905, many existing unions actively lobbied for racist and anti-immigration policies through the creation of the notorious Asiatic Exclusion League. That same year, a new union called the Industrial Workers of the World (IWW) was formed in Chicago. The IWW, also known as the Wobblies, differed from the AFL in significant ways:
 The IWW organized without regard to sex, skills, race, creed, or national origin, from the very start.
 The AFL was craft based while the IWW inherited the tradition of industrial unionism pioneered by the Knights of Labor, the American Railway Union and the Western Federation of Miners (WFM).
 The IWW promoted the concept of all workers in one big union. Ever cognizant of the common practice of AFL craft unions crossing each other's picket lines, the IWW adopted the WFM's description of the AFL as the "American Separation of Labor".
 The IWW believed that unions needed to build a labor movement with a structure that closely mapped the industries they sought to organize. A great merger movement had swept through corporations in the period from 1899 to 1903 and labor radicals believed that "the unifaction of capital represented by the rise of the new trusts needed to be countered by an equally unified organization of the entire working class".

From its inception in 1905, the IWW criticized existing craft unions for creating a "labor aristocracy". Eugene V. Debs wrote that "seasoned old unionists" could see that working people could not win with the labor movement they had. Debs believed the AFL practiced "organized scabbery" of one union on another, engaged in jurisdictional squabbling, was dominated by an autocratic leadership and the relationship between union leaders and millionaires in the National Civic Federation was much too cozy. IWW leaders believed that in the AFL there was too little solidarity and too little "straight" labor education. These circumstances led to too little appreciation of what could be won, and too little will to win it.

Animated by a class philosophy that saw capitalism as an economic system dividing society into two classes—those who own, manage, or rule; and those who have only their labor to sell—the IWW declared:[...] the working class and the employing class have nothing in common. [...] Between these two classes a struggle must go on until all the toilers [...] take and hold that which they produce by their labor through an economic organization of the working class.

In contrast, the AFL declared: We have no ultimate ends. We are going only from day to day. We are fighting only for immediate objects—objects that can be realized in a few years [...] we say in our constitution that we are opposed to theorists [...] we are all practical men.

Labor historian Melvyn Dubofsky has written the following: By 1896 Gompers and the AFL were moving to make their peace with Capitalism and the American system. Although the AFL had once preached the inevitability of class conflict and the need to abolish 'wage slavery', it slowly and almost imperceptibly began to proclaim the virtues of class harmony and the possibilities of a more benevolent Capitalism.

The AFL therefore preached "pure and simple" trade unionism. The AFL concerned itself with a "philosophy of pure wage consciousness", according to Selig Perlman, who developed the "business unionism" theory of labor. Perlman saw craft organizing as a means of resisting the encroachment of waves of immigrants. Organization that was based upon craft skills granted control over access to the job.

While craft unions provided a good defense for the privileges of membership, conventions such as time-limited contracts and pledges not to strike in solidarity with other workers severely limited the ability of craft unions to effect change in society at large, leaving only the ineffectual means granted by a business-dominated elite society, i.e. electoral politics, lobbying congress and a newly enfeebled economic weapon, the injunction-circumscribed strike. However, the AFL embraced this "businesslike" and "pragmatic" worldview, adopting the motto "A fair day's wage for a fair day's work".

The AFL outlived the class consciousness of its own founding Preamble, but the IWW embraced the goal of abolishing wage slavery. In 1908, the IWW responded to what it considered the AFL's class collaborationist tendencies with new wording in the IWW Preamble: Instead of the conservative motto, "A fair day's wage for a fair day's work," we must inscribe upon our banner the revolutionary watchword, "Abolition of the wage system." [...] The army of production must be organized, not only for the every-day struggle with capitalists, but also to carry on production when capitalism shall have been overthrown.

The IWW saw itself as the answer to the conservatism of the AFL. The IWW developed a variety of creative tactics in its effort to "build a new world within the shell of the old". Because the AFL declined to act as an ally in such a cause, the Wobblies sought to develop solidarity with all rank and file workers while criticizing or spoofing AFL union leadership. AFL union "bosses" were (and still are) referred to by the Wobblies as "piecards". To the IWW, all the union bureaucracy of the AFL functioned pretty much as a "labor aristocracy". In that regard, the IWW's views have not changed much over the years.

Mainstream unions have evolved, embracing some of the principles of industrial unionism and (in many cases) opening their doors to a greater spectrum of the working class. However, there are many aspects to business unionism that solidarity unionists still find suspect– a tendency to operate as a business, rather than according to "union principles"; enthroning elite hierarchies of leadership which are not easily recalled by the membership; deriving significant income from the sale of insurance or credit cards, arguably leading to conflicts of interest; union leadership compensation levels that are closer to those of corporate executives than of rank and file workers; top-down decision making; and building relationships with the leadership of corporations or political parties that the rank and file may view with suspicion.

All union movements function in some fashion to raise up workers in social/economic status and/or in union privilege. The significant difference between a union movement with a labor aristocracy and a union movement based upon class solidarity is how and to what extent the structure, bureaucracy and in particular policies and practices of that union movement function, either to leave that level of increased privilege as the status quo, or to recognize the necessity of building structural relationships, promoting education and engaging in solidarity activities with the specific intention of translating gains into an effort to enhance the status of all working people.

In Maoist Third Worldism 

In the 1983 book, Settlers argues that the class system in the United States is built upon the genocide of Native Americans and the enslavement of Africans and that the white working class in the United States constitutes a privileged labor aristocracy that lacks proletarian consciousness. Arguing that the white working class possesses a petit-bourgeois and reformist consciousness, the book posits that the colonized peoples of the United States constitutes the proletariat.

See also 

 Leninism
 Third-Worldism
 Stakhanovism

Notes 

Marxian economics
American Federation of Labor